Produce 101 Japan Season 2 is a 2021 Japanese male group reality competition show, and is the second overall season of the Japanese version of the franchise. The show brings 101 trainees with the intention of producing an 11-member permanent male group. Premiering on April 8, 2021, the show is being broadcast on GyaO! every Thursday at 9pm JST (GMT+9). The show is being streamed on YouTube every Friday at 9pm JST (GMT+9) with English subtitles available in certain countries.

The series is an official spin-off of the South Korean television series Produce 101. The series is a co-production between Yoshimoto Kogyo and CJ E&M. Weekly highlights are also being aired on TBS.

The top 11 winners debuted under the name INI.

Background
In November 2020, Yoshimoto Kogyo and CJ E&M announced they would be co-producing a 2nd Japanese version of the Produce 101 reality competition show with the intention of debuting an 11-member boy band in 2021 for the global music market. The group created from the show would be permanent and would be handled by Lapone Entertainment. Auditions for the show took place from December 4 to Dec 6, 2020 for male Japanese residents aged 15–27 years old who were not tied to any talent agency. On January 30, 2021, all 101 trainees profiles were revealed and Fuma Murata was shown to have withdrawn; the show's theme song, "Let Me Fly" was also revealed. Prior to the show's airing, another contestant, Fujisawa dropped out, totaling two withdrawing and leaving 99 trainees to compete on the show.

Contestants

Elimination Chart
Colors key

Episodes

Rankings
The top 11 contestants, which determined the members of the final group, were chosen through popularity online voting at Produce 101 Japan GyaO!s homepage, AR square app, VR square app and audience's live voting. The results were shown at the end of each episode.

For the on:tact, first voting period, viewers were allowed to select 11 trainees per vote. For the second round, the system changed to 2 trainee per vote. For the final round, the system changed to 1 trainee per vote and added live online votes.

ON:TACT voting period
The ON:TACT voting period took place between February 1 at 12 AM and February 10 at 11:59 PM (JST).

First voting period
The first voting period took place between April 8 at 9 AM and April 30 at 5 AM (JST). The total number of votes accumulated was 25,355,977.Notes  On Episode 4, an additional 3,000 points were given to all the members of the winning groups, which were combined with the votes given by the live audience.
  The ranking for Episode 5 is the result of combining online votes and live votes from the previous episode.

Second voting period
The second voting period took place between May 6 at 11 PM and May 28 at 5 AM (JST). The total number of votes accumulated was 9,285,810.Notes'
  On Episode 7, an additional 10,000 votes were given to the winner of each group and an additional 100,000 votes to the winner of each position category. These benefits were doubled for the winners of the HIDDEN category. Position winners also received an interview on regular TV, as well as in Anan and Oricon.
 On Episode 8, the winning group received a total of 240,000 additional votes: 20,000 votes for every member besides the one who placed first, who instead received 100,000 votes.
 The ranking for Episode 9 is the result of combining online votes and live votes from the previous episode.

Result

Discography

Extended plays

Broadcasting time & Reception

Broadcasting time

Ratings on TBS

Aftermath
 INI released their debut  Maxi single "A" which featured the promotional singles "Rocketeer" and "Brighter" on November 3, 2021.
 Some trainees formed/joined groups:
 Ota Shunsei (14th), Kaiho Nakano (19th), Toma Nakamura (20th), Yotsuya Shinsuke (22nd), Kohei Kurita (23rd), Shu Kobori (24th), Wataru Takahashi (30th), and Kose Naoki (17th on Episode 5 but left due to COVID-19 diagnosis) signed with Yoshimoto Kogyo and debuted in boy group OCTPATH on February 9, 2022.
 Daisuke Morisaki (68th) signed with Keystone Entertainment and debuted in boy group BLANK2Y under stage name Mikey on May 24, 2022.
 Daigo Kobayashi (13th) and Renta Nishijima (16th) signed with Wake One Entertainment and joined boy group TO1 as new members.
 Fuma Murata (withdrew before program aired) participated in "&AUDITION - The Howling" and debuted in boygroup &TEAM under Hybe Japan on December 7, 2022.
 Shoya Fukuda (32d), Vasayegh Hikaru (33rd), Masato Ueda (38th), Yusei Tekoe (39th), Rick Yasue (47th), Ryusuke Kodama (53rd) and Reiji Fukushima (57th) will debut in KEN THE 390-produced boy group Maison B on February 15, 2023 after pre-debuting on August 19, 2022.
 Some trainees signed with labels:
 Neo Yoshii (85th) announced that he signed with Avex Management on November 7, 2021.
 Okubo Naru (12th), Terao Koshin (17th), Hiramoto Ken (34th), Fukuda Ayuta (35th) signed with Lapone Entertainment as trainees and were revealed in December 2021.
 Syunji Koike (15th) and Hiroaki Morii (29th) appeared on YouTube channel 'Peche' on March 21, 2022, and are actively promoting while in Korea as trainees.
 Some trainees became independent artists:
 Hideaki Sasaoka (25th) released 'purple' as a digital EP in April 2022.
 Some trainees joined other survival shows:
 Kouki Sakamoto (21st) and Mizuki Shinohara (28th) joined Sony Music's TORA Project in November 2021 and appeared on 'Boku Debut?' (a joint project with Sony and Yoshimoto Kogyo) airing on BS Yoshimoto in July 2022.
 Fuma Murata (withdrew before program aired) participated in "&AUDITION - The Howling"
 Anthonny Iinuma (18th) and Yuki Miura (67th) will participate in "Boys Planet"

Franchise

References

External links
  

Japanese music television series
Produce 101